Christophe Bergeron, known by his alias, Pushy!, is an electronic music composer who currently lives and works in Paris, France.

Biography 
During the 80s, the noise/Indus electro movement offers Bergeron the opportunity to perfect his electronic programming, but it does not prevent him from participating in other projects with various aesthetics.

After the techno revolution, Bergeron created Pushy! Live with Yod, giving its first recognition to a breakbeat made in France that initiated many budding musicians. Pushy! became a major artist of the French drum'n'bass / electro-break scene.

After the withdraw of Yod in 1995, Chris performed solo under Pushy! Two albums followed: Free Form (2003), then Hors Not (2007), and around ten maxis.

A pioneer of electro-rap with Cheravif (1999), Pushy! collaborated with other artists (Bams, Sayoko, Néry, Laurent de Wilde & Otisto 23, Loan, and E Komba) and developed a side project 100% dubstep under the pseudonym Hupsy Down.

His music is fed by its various collaborations. He has explored other paths (theater, contemporary dance, installations, fashion shows, short film, films...) along with personalities such as Marc Caro, Christophe Haleb, Jean-Luc Testu, Darja Richter, Kaat Tilley, Isabelle Boutrois, Viviana Moin, Pascale Siméon and Nicolas Hulot.

Influences 
Among the influences of Pushy! are Stravinsky for his rhythms, Erik Satie for his simplicity, John Cage for his concept, Steve Reich, Fred Frith, the dub-hop of WordSound, and also traditional music and salsa.

Pushy! is influenced by the 80s, especially bands such as Residents and Virgin Prunes as well as Cabaret Voltaire and Bourbonese Qualk who already proposed a musical perspective similar to plastic art that prioritizes intention and gesture. French electro pioneers like Le Syndicat, Urbain Autopsy, and Pierre Jolivet a.k.a. Pacific 231.

Labels like Warp or Ambush contributed a lot to the evolution of a kind drum and bass and also Fennesz, Boris Cavage and Farmers Manuals in another gene (electronic music and visual art).

Discography

CDs 
 2011: Epiderme synthétique - album - Kiosk eclectic 
 2007: Hors Not - album - Kiosk eclectic / La Baleine 
 2007: Serial - live - Belleville zoo
 2003: Free form - album - Furtif records / La Baleine
 1999: Music for films, TV, dance companies, fashion shows and art exhibitions - Universal
 1999: La vérité est ailleurs - Cheravif - 4 titles - Universal
 1998: Worn to a shadow - live au Bataclan 98 - Universal
 1998: Pushy! - EP/CD 4 titles - Hokus Pokus
 1997: Pushy! - EP/CD 4 titles - Hokus Pokus

Maxi vinyl 
 2008: Hupsy Down - Dest pub
 2007: Serial Decibel - Belleville zoo
 2004: Melodie gun - Ruby Breakfast
 2003: Images in a nation - Kiosk eclectic 02
 2002: Neon rouge (with Ciao Manhattan & J-F. Pauvros) - Sphénoïde Records
 2000: Cheravif - Code mode amnesique - Kiosk eclectic
 2000: Pushy! untitled EP - Perce-oreille
 2000: Pushy! untitled EP - Hokus Pokus
 2000: Gnats 45 tours 2 titles
 1999: Antikrout - Hokus Pokus
 1999: Audiokyste live - double EP - Mouse Clinic
 1998: Pushy ! vs Mouse clinic - EP Abracadabra

Collaborations 
 2009: Je vais t'offrir - Bams - Autoproduction
 2009: Cheravif, Global glauque live - Le Bison
 2008: Laurent de Wilde & Otisto 23 - PC Pieces remixed by Friends - DTC Records
 2008: Future exposed - BD sonore - 1 title - IOT Records
 2008: Dosis decibel 4 - 1 title - Dosis decibel
 2006: Sonde la bass - Jungle therapy
 2006: A - Album "A" - Isabé - Together Prod
 2003: Running dub - Remix Kali Live Dub
 2002: They shout things - compilation How do you sleep - Jarring Effects
 2001: Kingsympathyrodney 2000 king (Rmx Ciao Manhattan Ft Mike Ladd) - KungFuFighting
 2001: Melodie gun - Compilation - Hypertunez
 2001: Sexual manœuvre in da park - Compilation Mizé 5 - Mizé Records
 1998: Rumours of war - Compilation P18 records - Esan Ozenki Records
 1997: Let the revolution come - Compilation Avant gardism 2 - Law & Auder (UK)
 1997: Grooveboxing - Compilation Groovebox - Distance Records
 1997: M'Boke ya bisengo (feat E-Komba) - Compilation Sun Sun - Columbia - Sony
 1997: Le robot qui fait sentir son haleine - Compilation Dome - Musidisc
 1996: Remix of Lofofora - EP Amne's History - Virgin
 1996: Cop phobia - Compilation Avant Gardism 1 - Law & Auder (UK)

References

External links 
 Official site

Living people
Electroacoustic music composers
French electronic musicians
Year of birth missing (living people)